The 2022 Premier Volleyball League Open Conference was the eleventh conference of the Premier Volleyball League (38th conference of the former Shakey's V-League) and its second conference as a professional league.

The conference was held from March 16 to April 8, 2022, pending restrictions brought by the ongoing COVID-19 pandemic. A pool play format will be adapted for the first time wherein teams will be divided into two pools as opposed to a round-robin format where all teams play against each other at least once. Preliminary round was held at the Paco Arena in Manila. Quarterfinal round and Semifinals Game 1 & 3 was held at the San Juan Arena in San Juan. The Semifinals Game 2 and Finals Game 1 was held at SM Mall of Asia Arena in Pasay while Finals Game 2 was held at Ynares Center in Antipolo, Rizal.

Nine teams competed on this conference as Chery Tiggo 7 Pro Crossovers looks to defend their championship. F2 Logistics Cargo Movers will have their debut in the Premier Volleyball League. Two teams from the previous conference, Sta. Lucia Lady Realtors and Perlas Spikers, filed for leave of absence from the league and released all of their players.

Participating teams

Venues
The conference started on a "semi-bubble" setup with a strict home-venue-home format for teams at the Paco Arena with no spectators allowed in the venue due to COVID-19 restrictions. After the preliminary round, the league officially started accepting live audiences to watch the games in the playoffs.

Format
For the first time in league history, the Open Conference catered multiple pools in the preliminary round with the nine participating teams grouped into two pools. The groupings were unveiled on February 18, 2022 with teams grouped through serpentine system using 2021 Open Conference final standings. F2 Logistics Cargo Movers was drawn to Pool A during their meeting as they did not compete in the last conference. The following format will be conducted for the entirety of the conference:
Preliminary Round
 Single-round robin format; 2 pools; Teams are ranked using the FIVB Ranking System.
 All teams except the last finishing team in the pool of five will advance to the quarterfinals.
Quarterfinals
 QF1: #A1 vs #B4 (#A1 twice-to-beat)
 QF2: #B1 vs #A4 (#B1 twice-to-beat)
 QF3: #A2 vs #B3 (#A2 twice-to-beat)
 QF4: #B2 vs #A3 (#B2 twice-to-beat)
Classification
 7th-9th place: Single-round robin format; #A5, QF1 Loser, & QF2 Loser; Teams are ranked using the FIVB Ranking System.
 5th place: QF3 Loser vs. QF4 Loser
Semifinals (best-of-3 series)
 SF1: QF1 Winner vs. QF3 Winner
 SF2: QF2 Winner vs. QF4 Winner
Finals (best-of-3 series)
 Bronze medal: SF1 Loser vs SF2 Loser
 Gold medal: SF1 Winner vs SF2 Winner

Transactions

National team players 
The following players are part of the national team that will compete in the 31st Southeast Asian Games in May.

Team additions and transfers
The following are the players who transferred to another team on the upcoming conference.

Pool standing procedure
 Number of matches won
 Match points
 Sets ratio
 Points ratio
 If the tie continues as per the point ratio between two teams, the priority will be given to the team which won the last match between them. When the tie in points ratio is between three or more teams, a new classification of these teams in the terms of points 1, 2 and 3 will be made taking into consideration only the matches in which they were opposed to each other.

Match won 3–0 or 3–1: 3 match points for the winner, 0 match points for the loser
Match won 3–2: 2 match points for the winner, 1 match point for the loser.

Preliminary round 
All times are Philippines Standard Time (UTC+8:00).

Ranking

Pool A 

|}

Pool B 

|}

Match results

Pool A match results 
|}

Pool B match results 
|}

Classification round 
All times are Philippines Standard Time (UTC+08:00)
The losers between A2 and B3, and B2 and A3 will face for the 5th-6th place match
A5, and the losers between A1 and B4, and B1 and A4 will face on a round-robin format and ranked by points.

7th-9th places 

|}

|}

5th place match 
|}

Final round 
All times are Philippines Standard Time (UTC+08:00)
Top two teams from each pool will have a twice to beat advantage in the Quarterfinals
Both Semifinals and Finals are best-of-three series

Brackets 

{{8TeamBracket-info

| RD1=Quarterfinals
| RD2=Semifinals
| RD3=Championships
| RD3b=3rd place match
| autolegs=yes
| boldwinner=high
| nowrap=yes

| RD1-text1=March 28
| RD1-seed1=A1
| RD1-team1= Cignal HD Spikers
| RD1-score1-1=3
| RD1-score1-2=
| RD1-seed2=B4
| RD1-team2= 
| RD1-score2-1=0
| RD1-score2-2=
| RD1-text2=March 29
| RD1-seed3=B2
| RD1-team3= Petro Gazz Angels
| RD1-score3-1=3
| RD1-score3-2=
| RD1-seed4=A3
| RD1-team4= F2 Logistics Cargo Movers
| RD1-score4-1=1
| RD1-score4-2=
| RD1-text3=March 28
| RD1-seed5=B1
| RD1-team5= Creamline Cool Smashers
| RD1-score5-1=3
| RD1-score5-2=
| RD1-seed6=A4
| RD1-team6= Chery Tiggo 7 Pro Crossovers
| RD1-score6-1=1
| RD1-score6-2=
| RD1-text4=March 29
| RD1-seed7=A2
| RD1-team7= Choco Mucho Flying Titans
| RD1-score7-1=3
| RD1-score7-2=
| RD1-seed8=B3
| RD1-team8= PLDT High Speed Hitters
| RD1-score8-1=2
| RD1-score8-2=

| RD2-text1=April 1–4
| RD2-team1= Cignal HD Spikers
| RD2-score1-1=3
| RD2-score1-2=2
| RD2-score1-3=1
| RD2-team2= Petro Gazz Angels
| RD2-score2-1=0
| RD2-score2-2=3
| RD2-score2-3=3
| RD2-text2=April 1–3
| RD2-team3= Creamline Cool Smashers| RD2-score3-1=3
| RD2-score3-2=3
| RD2-score3-3=
| RD2-team4= Choco Mucho Flying Titans
| RD2-score4-1=1
| RD2-score4-2=1
| RD2-score4-3=

| RD3-text1=April 6–8
| RD3-team1= Petro Gazz Angels
| RD3-score1-1=1
| RD3-score1-2=1
| RD3-score1-3=
| RD3-team2= Creamline Cool Smashers
| RD3-score2-1=3
| RD3-score2-2=3
| RD3-score2-3=

| RD3b-text1=April 6–8
| RD3b-team1= Cignal HD Spikers| RD3b-score1-1=1
| RD3b-score1-2=3
| RD3b-score1-3=
| RD3b-team2= Choco Mucho Flying Titans
| RD3b-score2-1=3
| RD3b-score2-2=1
| RD3b-score2-3=
}}

 Quarterfinals 
|}

 Semifinals Q1 vs Q3|}Q2 vs Q4'''
|}

Finals

3rd place 
|}
Note:

Championships 
|}

Awards and medalists

Individual awards

Medalists

Final standings

See also 
 2022 Spikers' Turf Open Conference

References 

2022 in Philippine sport
April 2022 sports events in the Philippines